John William Payne (1844 – 12 May 1928 at Glebe, Sydney) was a Test match umpire.  

Payne officiated in one match between Australia and England in Sydney on 20 February 1885 to 24 February 1885, won by Australia by only six runs thanks to an 80 run tenth wicket partnership, and a 10 wicket bag by Fred Spofforth.  Payne's colleague was Ted Elliott. Payne had played for the XXII of New South Wales against the visiting English team under George Parr in 1863/64.

Payne started work at Mort's Dock in the Sydney suburb of Balmain in 1868 and worked there for 56 years.

See also
Australian Test Cricket Umpires
List of Test umpires

External links
Cricinfo Profile
List of matches umpired by Payne
Obituary, Wisden

References

 Pollard, Jack, "Australian Cricket: 1803-1893, The Formative Years". Sydney, The Book Company, 1995.

1844 births
1928 deaths
Australian Test cricket umpires